Nicole D. Theriot is an American diplomat who is the nominee to be the next US Ambassador to Guyana.

Early life and education
Theriot holds a B.A. degree from Louisiana State University and a Master’s degree in International Relations from Vanderbilt University.

Career
Theriot is a career member of the Senior Foreign Service with the rank of Counselor. Currently, she serves as the Principal Officer in Karachi, Pakistan. She has also served as Deputy Chief of Mission at the U.S. Embassy in Port-au-Prince, Haiti. Theriot served as Immigration and Visa Security Director at the White House National Security Council. Before this, she served as a Senior Advisor to the Deputy Assistant Secretary of State for Overseas Citizens Services in the Bureau of Consular Affairs. Theriot also served as Political Counselor at the U.S. Embassy in Kabul, Afghanistan, along with Principal Officer in Casablanca, Morocco as well as the Bureau of Consular Affairs’ Supervisory Regional Consular Officer in Frankfurt, Germany. Other overseas assignments include Internal Politics Chief in Islamabad, Pakistan; Consul General in Barbados and the Eastern Caribbean; Deputy Consular Chief in Baghdad, Iraq; Non-immigrant Visa Chief in Montreal, Canada; Consular Officer in Paris, France; and Information Officer in Lagos, Nigeria.

Nominee as Ambassador to Guyana
On September 7, 2022, President Joe Biden nominated Theriot to be the next ambassador to Guyana. On September 12, 2022, her nomination was sent to the Senate. Her nomination was not acted upon for the rest of the year and was returned to Biden on January 3, 2023.

President Biden renominated Theriot the next day. Her nomination is pending before the Senate Foreign Relations Committee.

Awards and recognitions
Theriot has won numerous State Department performance awards, including a Senior Foreign Service Performance award.

Personal life
A native of Baton Rouge, Louisiana, Theriot speaks French and Urdu.

References

Year of birth missing (living people)
Louisiana State University alumni
Vanderbilt University alumni
American diplomats
United States Foreign Service personnel
People from Baton Rouge, Louisiana
United States Department of State officials
Living people
American women diplomats
21st-century American diplomats